Anita Kazai (born 28 May 1988) is a Hungarian handball er for Dunaújvárosi KKA and the Hungarian national team.

Career
A native of Szeged, has four siblings. When she was 16, playing with her school team on a tournament against schoolgirls of Debrecen, DVSC youth coach spotted her and immediately asked whether she would like to join the Hajdú-Bihar side.

In her inaugural season by DVSC she could not break into the first team yet and played only for the second team. From the next season, as she got more matured, she had some playing minutes in the first team too, and had the chance to prove herself in the playoffs (2 matches/3 goals). The breakthrough came in 2009, and since then, despite her young age, she was an important member of the first team.

She debuted in the national team on 28 September 2018 against Montenegro at the age of 30.

Personal
Because of her fragile, slender body she got the nickname Csibe (Chicken) from her first coach, Imre Bíró. Her best friend is her former room-mate Viktória Csáki.

Achievements
Nemzeti Bajnokság I:
Silver Medallist: 2010, 2011
Magyar Kupa:
Silver Medallist: 2011
World University Championship:
Winner: 2010

References

External links
Anita Kazai player profile on Debreceni VSC Official Website
Anita Kazai career statistics at Worldhandball

1988 births
Living people
Sportspeople from Szeged
Hungarian female handball players
Fehérvár KC players